Accused is a 1936 British mystery film directed by Thornton Freeland and starring Douglas Fairbanks, Jr., Dolores del Río and Florence Desmond. It was made at Isleworth Studios by the independent Criterion Films, which Fairbanks was a co-owner of. The film's sets were designed by Edward Carrick.

Premise
Two dance partners become embroiled in a murder mystery when one of the dancers is accused of murder.

Cast
 Douglas Fairbanks, Jr. as Tony Seymour
 Dolores del Río as Gaby Seymour
 Florence Desmond as Yvette Delange
 Edward Rigby as Alphonse de la Riveire
 Basil Sydney as Eugene Roget
 Googie Withers as Ninette Duval
 J.H. Roberts as President of Court 
 Cecil Humphreys as Prosecuting Counsel  
 Esme Percy as Morel  
 Moore Marriott as Dubec 
 Cyril Raymond as Guy Henry 
 Roland Culver as Henry Capelle  
 Leo Genn as  Man

References

Bibliography
 Harris, Ed. Britain's Forgotten Film Factory: The Story of Isleworth Studios. Amberley Publishing, 2012.
 Low, Rachael. The History of the British Film, 1929-1939. Film Making in 1930s Britain. George Allen & Unwin, 1985.
 Wood, Linda. British Films, 1929-1939. British Film Institute, 1986.

External links

 

1936 films
1936 crime films
1936 mystery films
British crime films
British mystery films
1930s English-language films
Films directed by Thornton Freeland
Films shot at Isleworth Studios
British black-and-white films
Films set in Paris
United Artists films
British courtroom films
Films scored by Percival Mackey
1930s British films